Patton Village may refer to:
Patton Village, California
Patton Village, Texas